Cody Beau Walker (born June 13, 1988) is an American actor. He is the youngest brother of actor Paul Walker, and helped complete the final scenes for his character Brian O'Conner in the film Furious 7 (2015) following his brother's death. Walker made his acting debut in Abandoned Mine (2013). He went on to appear in films USS Indianapolis: Men of Courage (2016) and The Last Full Measure (2020).

Early life
Cody Walker was born on June 13, 1988, in Los Angeles, California. His mother, Cheryl (née Crabtree), was a fashion model, and his father, Paul William Walker III, was a sewer contractor and former amateur boxer, who was a two-time Golden Gloves champion. Walker's paternal grandfather, William, had a short-lived boxing career as "Irish" Billy Walker, while another raced factory cars for Ford in the 1960s. Walker grew up with four siblings: Aimee, Ashlie, Caleb, and actor Paul.

Walker graduated from La Cañada High School in 2006 and subsequently earned a Bachelor's Degree in Cultural Anthropology from the University of California, Santa Barbara. He is a licensed paramedic after completing Emergency Medical Technician (EMT) certification from University of California, Los Angeles, Center for Prehospital Care. Walker moved to Coos County, Oregon, and worked as a paramedic in an ambulance for nearly three years.

Career
Walker made his acting debut in the horror film Abandoned Mine (2013), portraying the role of Thomas. The film received mixed reviews.

Walker appeared in the action film Furious 7 (2015) after his brother Paul died on November 30, 2013, in a single-vehicle accident. Cody and Caleb Walker both stepped in to help finish their brother's scenes as Brian O'Conner in the movie, which was still filming at the time of Paul's death. Furious 7 premiered in Los Angeles on April 1, 2015, and was theatrically released in the United States on April 3, exactly six years after the fourth film was released. Upon release, the film became a critical and financial success, and it grossed $397.6 million worldwide during its opening weekend, which was the highest of all-time at the time. The film grossed over $1.5 billion worldwide, making it the third highest-grossing film of 2015 and the fourth highest-grossing film of all time at the time of release. After his appearance in Furious 7, Walker decided to pursue acting, and signed with Paradigm Talent Agency in 2015.

He portrayed Petty Officer Third class James West in the World War II film USS Indianapolis: Men of Courage (2016) alongside Nicolas Cage and Matt Lanter. The film is based largely on the true story of the loss of the ship of the same name in the closing stages of the Second World War. He appeared in the documentary film I Am Paul Walker (2018) that aired on Paramount Network. Walker played Eric Shaw in the action-adventure film Shadow Wolves (2019), which was originally planned to be a television series. He appeared in the war drama film The Last Full Measure (2020) as Young Kepper. Beginning in the fall of 2023, Walker and his wife Felicia will be the new hosts of a renovation series known as Fast: Home Rescue for broadcast syndication to be produced by Byron Allen's company Allen Media Group.

Philanthropy
Walker is the Chief Executive Officer for his brother Paul's charity foundation, Reach Out Worldwide, that helps bring first responders to disaster areas to augment local relief efforts. In November 2020, Reach Out Worldwide donated 120 cases of hand sanitizer to North Bend Fire Department during COVID-19 pandemic. Walker is the co-founder of car show FuelFuest, which returned for the fourth time in June 2022. The car show benefits Reach Out Worldwide.

Personal life 
Walker married his girlfriend of seven years, Felicia Knox, on August 15, 2015, in Gold Beach, Oregon. The couple have two children together, a daughter who was born in December 2017 and a son born in November 2020.

Filmography

Film

Television

Music videos

References

External links
Walker, C., with Fox, T. and Leonard, M. (May 24, 2021). Cody Walker loves to drive fast & furious and save the world. No Focks Given podcast (Ep. 29), YouTube. Viewed same day.

1988 births
21st-century American male actors
American male film actors
Living people
Male actors from California
Male actors from Los Angeles
University of California, Santa Barbara alumni